Princess Royal was  a snow launched in 1787, probably at Parkgate, Cheshire. She first appeared in Lloyd's Register (LR) in 1810.

Captain William Phillips received a letter of marque on 23 January 1810. Princess Royal was lost later that year at Faial Island.

Citations

1787 ships
Age of Sail merchant ships of England
Maritime incidents in 1810